Francisco Jarley Colorado Hernández (born May 13, 1980 in San Rafael, Antioquia) is a Colombian road racing cyclist, who last rode for Ecuadorian amateur team Team Saitel Ecuador.

Major results

2005
 10th Overall Clásico Ciclístico Banfoandes
2006
 1st Stage 8 Vuelta Ciclista a Costa Rica
 3rd Overall Vuelta a El Salvador
 4th Overall Vuelta al Táchira
 10th Overall Tour de Beauce
1st  Mountains classification
2007
 2nd Overall Vuelta Ciclista a Costa Rica
1st Stage 12
 5th Overall Vuelta a Venezuela
1st Stage 10
 10th Overall Vuelta al Táchira
1st Stage 9
2008
 10th Overall Vuelta a Colombia
2009
 9th Overall Vuelta a Colombia
1st Prologue
2010
 3rd Overall Vuelta a Guatemala
 4th Overall Vuelta a Colombia
 5th Overall Vuelta a Cuba
2012
 1st  Most Aggressive USA Pro Cycling Challenge
 10th Overall Vuelta a la Comunidad de Madrid
2013
 10th Overall Vuelta a Guatemala
2014
 2nd Overall Vuelta a Guatemala
1st Stage 6
2015
 1st  Overall Vuelta Mexico Telmex
 3rd Overall Tour of Qinghai Lake
1st  Mountains classification
2017
 5th Overall Tour of Fuzhou
 9th Overall Tour of Almaty
 10th Overall Tour of Xingtai

References

External links 

1980 births
Living people
Colombian male cyclists
Vuelta a Colombia stage winners
Vuelta a Venezuela stage winners
Sportspeople from Antioquia Department
21st-century Colombian people